The Consortium of European Research Libraries (CERL) is a consortium of research libraries, primarily in Europe, that facilitates access to historians with an interest in the history of the book by providing online resources. The organisation also makes grants to librarians, holds seminars and workshops, and since 1998 has published a periodical called CERL Papers. It was founded in 1992 and since 1994 has been registered in the United Kingdom as a company limited by guarantee, based in London.

Organisation 
The Consortium of European Research Libraries is governed by a board of directors and a management team. The chairman is Kristian Jensen, of the British Library, who was appointed in 2017 to succeed , former chief librarian at the University of Uppsala. Its annual general meeting is usually held in November.

Member institutions 
 the consortium has 293 members, primarily in Europe but also in Central and South America and the US. Of these, single members (full fee) and special members (who pay a reduced fee) have one vote at the annual general meeting; groups of not more than 16 libraries share one vote; and cluster members associated with a single member may not vote.

Online resources

Heritage of the Printed Book Database 
The Heritage of the Printed Book Database, formerly the Hand Press Book Database,  contained almost 5 million entries for books printed during the hand press era, from the introduction of printing technology to Europe around 1450 to the mid-19th century, with descriptions facilitating comparison of variant versions. At that time 41 institutions had contributed entries, which are primarily based on examination of the item rather than on retroconversion of earlier bibliographic entries. The database is continuously updated, primarily by member institutions.

The HPB database was hosted by the US-based OCLC from September 2007 until 2013, and uses OCLC's FirstSearch and Connexion software. Since September 2013 it has been hosted by the German . Access is limited to CERL member institutions and licencees.

Material Evidence in Incunabula 
Material Evidence in Incunabula is a database of 15th-century printed works (incunabula) that draws on the Incunabula Short Title Catalogue of the British Library and combines them with data about individual copies. Its development was initially funded by the British Academy. Access to the database is free.

CERL Thesaurus 
The CERL Thesaurus, managed by the Data Conversion Group in Göttingen, indexes locations, printers, publishers and authors for works printed between c. 1450 and 1850, and thus serves in association with the Integrated Authority File to cross-reference variant names in printings and catalogues. It is automatically updated with the Material Evidence in Incunabula database and offers links to information on provenance provided by CERL member institutions, reflecting now dispersed collections, and also includes digitised material such as images of printer's marks collected by Vindel, Ronald McKerrow and Philippe Renouard and of watermarks. Access to the thesaurus is free.

CERL Portal 
The CERL Portal was developed by the Electronic Publishing Centre of the Uppsala University Library after the completion of the CERL Manuscripts Project. It permitted combined searches of both manuscripts and printed books, in manuscript databases, the HPB and additional relevant online databases such as the English Short-Title Catalogue and photograph databases. It was discontinued in 2020.

References

Sources

External links 
 Official website
 HPB database
 CERL Thesaurus
 Material Evidence in Incunabula

Bibliographic database providers
College and university associations and consortia in Europe
Education in the London Borough of Islington
International organisations based in London
Libraries in Europe
Organisations based in the London Borough of Islington
Organizations established in 1992